The Central Macedonia Army Section (Tmima Stratias Kentrikis Makedonias, TSKM) was an army corps-level command of the Hellenic Army established on 6 March 1941. It was commanded by Lt. General Ioannis Kotoulas and comprised the 12th Infantry Division and the 20th Infantry Division. On 28 March it was assigned to Henry Maitland Wilson's 'W' Force, holding the Vermion Mountains–Haliacmon line. It was defeated and dissolved in mid-April 1941 during the German invasion of Greece.

Order of battle (6 April 1941)
 20th Infantry Division (Maj. General Christos Karassos)
 12th Infantry Division (Col. Georgios Karambatos)
 10th Frontier Sector (Col. of the Reserve Aristotelis Sergios)
 Field Artillery Battalion
 150mm Skoda Howitzer Battalion
 85mm Artillery Battery
 Anti-Aircraft Artillery Battalion
 Support units

Leadership

Commanders
 Lt. General of the Reserve, Ioannis Kotoulas (6 March – 8 April 1941)
 Maj. General Christos Karassos (8–20 April 1941)

Chiefs of staff
 Col. Antonios Peppas (3–19 March 1941)
 Col. Konstantinos Papadopoulos (19 March – 20 April 1941)

Headquarters
 Kozani (6 March 1941)
 Perdikkas (9 April 1941)
 Kivotos (14 April 1941)
 Ioannina (16 April 1941)
 Metsovo (18 April 1941)

References

Sources 
 
 

Corps of Greece
Battle of Greece
Military units and formations established in 1941
Military units and formations disestablished in 1941
Military units and formations of Greece in World War II
Greek Macedonia in World War II